Vitéz Károly Soós de Bádok (28 July 1869 – 24 June 1953) was a Hungarian military officer and politician, who served as Minister of Defence in 1920. He participated in the working of revolutionary counter-government organizations on Szeged against the Hungarian Soviet Republic. Soós became the first Chief of Army Staff of the National Army.

References

 Magyar Életrajzi Lexikon
Rövid életrajza

1869 births
1953 deaths
People from Sibiu
People from the Kingdom of Hungary
Defence ministers of Hungary
Austro-Hungarian generals
Hungarian soldiers
Austro-Hungarian military personnel of World War I
Hungarian anti-communists